is a Japanese manga artist, whose works include the science-fiction/horror series Parasyte. The Mixx editions of Parasyte romanize his name as "Hitosi Iwaaki", while the Del Rey Manga editions use "Hitoshi Iwaaki".

Career 
During high school, he was reading a lot of manga by Osamu Tezuka, which inspired him to begin drawing manga himself. He began working as an assistant for manga artist Kazuo Kamimura in 1984. In 1985, his short story "Gomi no Umi" won the newcomer award Tetsuya Chiba Award and was published in a special edition of Morning magazine. Since then, he has worked mainly for Kodansha, especially Afternoon magazine.

In 1993, Iwaaki received the Kodansha Manga Award for Parasyte. In 2010, Historie took the grand prize in the manga division of the Japan Media Arts Festival. Historie also earned him the 2012 Tezuka Osamu Cultural Prize Grand Prize. Iwaaki won the 2020 Saito Takao Award for his work on Reiri.

Works 
 "Gomi no Umi (ゴミの海, Morning Open, 1985)
 Fuuko no Iru Mise (4 volumes, Morning 1986–1988)
 Hone no Oto (1 volume, short stories, Morning 1990, large format edition, 2003)
 Parasyte (10 volumes, Afternoon 1990–1995, Perfect Edition: 8 volumes, 2003) First published in English by Mixx (Tokyopop), republished in English by Del Rey Manga
 Tanabata no Kuni ("The Country of Tanabata") (4 volumes, Big Comic Spirits, Perfect Edition: 2 volumes, 2003)
 Yuki no Touge, Tsurugi no Mai (2001)
 Heureka (2002, Young Animal Arashi)
 Historie (2003–present, 11 volumes as of July 2019, Afternoon)
 Reiri (2015–2018, Bessatsu Shonen Champion) – writer only, illustrated by Daisuke Muroi

References

External links 

 

1960 births
People from Tokyo
Manga artists from Tokyo
Living people
Winner of Kodansha Manga Award (General)